The women's giant slalom at the 2007 Asian Winter Games was held on 31 January 2007 at the Beida Lake Skiing Resort, China.

Schedule
All times are China Standard Time (UTC+08:00)

Results
Legend
DNF — Did not finish

References

Results

External links
Official website

Women giant slalom